Terry Todd (December 31, 1937 – July 7, 2018) was an American powerlifter, and Olympic weightlifter. Todd was co-founder of the H.J. Lutcher Stark Center for Physical Culture and Sports, co-editor of Iron Game History: The Journal of Physical Culture, and creator and event director of the Arnold Strongman Classic.

Todd also held a career as a journalist on the staff of Sports Illustrated magazine, as well as doing commentary for CBS, NBC, ESPN and National Public Radio.

Education
Todd was on the varsity tennis team at Travis High School. Pursuing a doctorate degree, he was educated at the University of Texas, Austin and began weight training after high school to make his left arm as strong as his dominant tennis arm.

Athletic history
Todd began as a weightlifter in 1956, and won the Junior Nationals in Olympic weightlifting in 1963. He then turned to powerlifting, and won the first two national championships in 1964 and in 1965 (the first official Senior Nationals) as a superheavyweight. At the 1965 Nationals, Todd became the first man to squat more than 700 lbs. in competition, by squatting 710 lbs. at a bodyweight of 335 lbs.

His best official lifts were: a 720-pound squat, a 515-pound bench press, and a 742-pound deadlift. Todd retired from competition in 1967.

Powerlifting Federation services
Todd was directly involved in the development of the sport of women's powerlifting. He helped his wife Jan Todd organize the first national women's meet in 1977, and coached the women's Canadian team, with Jan, from 1976-1979. In 1979, Todd was elected to the Executive Committee of the United States Powerlifting Federation. Todd lobbied for, and ultimately achieved autonomy for the women's committee, but finally abandoned the USPF when he could not convince the organization to institute a steroid testing program for men and women lifters. In the following few years, he also did color commentary for national and international powerlifting events for NBC, CBS, ESPN, and the BBC, some of which involved women's powerlifting.

In 1977, Todd published the first major book about powerlifting, called Inside Powerlifting. Todd covered the major national and international powerlifting events during the 1970s and 1980s for such magazines as Muscular Development and Iron Man. He also helped to introduce powerlifting to a larger audience through his articles in Sports Illustrated, covering such lifters as Lamar Gant, Bill Kazmaier, Larry Pacifico, and Jan Todd.

Later years
Once he stopped competing, he became a college professor in 1967 at Auburn University. Todd taught at several universities in both the United States and Canada before finally returning to his alma mater, the University of Texas, in 1983.

In 1990, Todd and his wife, Jan, founded the H.J. Lutcher Stark Center for Physical Culture and Sports, which is housed in the Darrell K Royal – Texas Memorial Stadium at The University of Texas in Austin. It contains more than 150,000 books, photos, films, magazines, letters, training courses, videotapes, posters, paintings and artifacts across its . The collection covers the history of competitive lifting, professional strongmen and strongwomen, sports nutrition, bodybuilding, naturopathy, conditioning for athletes, drug use in sports and alternative medicine. Todd retired from the classroom in the 1990s and served as the Director of the H.J. Lutcher Stark Center for Physical Culture and Sports until at least 2009.

In 2001, Todd was asked by Arnold Schwarzenegger to create a Strongman contest for the annual Arnold Sports Festival, which is held in Columbus, Ohio.

Personal life
Todd lived with his wife Jan on a  cattle ranch on the San Marcos River with a large collection of animals including 5 peacocks, a Percheron draft horse, 50 cattle, two Sicilian donkeys, an English Mastiff dog, an Emu, and three Maine Coon Cats.

Todd died on July 7, 2018 in Austin, Texas at the age of 80. Former Governor of California Schwarzenegger released a statement on Twitter: "[Todd] was such a monster - a true force, but also a kind heart and a great storyteller".

Personal records
Squat - 720 lbs
Bench press - 515 lbs
Deadlift - 742 lbs

References

1937 births
2018 deaths
Sportspeople from Austin, Texas
American powerlifters
American male weightlifters
American strength athletes
People associated with physical culture
Sports historians
University of Texas at Austin alumni
Auburn University faculty